The 2006–07 Irish League Cup (known as the CIS Insurance Cup for sponsorship reasons) was the 21st edition of Northern Ireland's secondary football knock-out cup competition. It concluded on 2 December 2006 with the final.

Linfield were the defending champions after their eighth League Cup win last season; a 3–0 victory over Glentoran in the previous final. This season Glentoran gained some revenge by defeating the Blues at the semi-final stage. The Glens went on to lift the cup for the sixth time by defeating Cliftonville 1–0 in the final. This was the ninth time in ten years that the cup had been won by one of Belfast's Big Two.

The 16 clubs taking part were divided into four groups of four clubs. The clubs in each group played each other at home and away. The top two clubs from each group then advanced to the quarter-finals where they played a single knock-out tie against another quarter-finalist. The semi-finals were played in the same format with the two winners of the ties advancing to the single match final.

Group stage

Group A

Group B

Group C

Group D

Quarter-finals

Semi-finals

Final

References

Lea
2006–07 domestic association football cups
2006-07